Navid Ghasemi (born 26 August 1991 in Khorramabad) is an Iranian BMX cyclist athlete. He is the head coach of the BMX national cycling team of Iran since 24 April 2022.

BMX career life
Navid Ghasemi is a self-trained BMX cyclist. He has participated in an international coaching course held by New Zealander coach Matt Cameron in South Korea. Navid Ghasemi had won the national BMX cycling competitions ranked as national champion on July 19, 2019.

Ghasemi had an accident in Cheonggyecheon  World Championships (2018) in South Korea and could not manage to achieve rank or win a medal.

Navid Ghasemi ranked as 11th in the Second BMX Asian cycling Championships in Jakarta, Indonesia.  Ghasemi is mentioned as the first Iranian BMX cycling coach with an international degree, who is currently (May 2022) the head coach of the national BMX cycling team and the head of the in Tehran Cycling Board in Cycling Federation of Iran. The athlete has also performed on the New Era talent TV series.

External Links
 Cycling Federation of Iran

References

Living people
1991 births
Iranian male cyclists
BMX riders
21st-century Iranian people